The Free-minded People's Party (FVP) or Radical People's Party was a social liberal party in the German Empire, founded as a result of the split of the German Free-minded Party in 1893. One of its most notable members was Eugen Richter, who was party leader from 1893 to 1906. The party advocated liberalism, social progressivism and parliamentarism.

On 6 March 1910, the party merged with the Free-minded Union and the German People's Party to form the Progressive People's Party.

See also
 Contributions to liberal theory
 Liberal democracy
 Liberalism
 Liberalism in Germany
 Liberalism worldwide
 List of liberal parties

References 

Germany 1893
Defunct political parties in Germany
Political parties established in 1893
Liberal parties in Germany
Radical parties
Political parties of the German Empire
Political parties disestablished in 1910